Palkovice is a municipality and village in Frýdek-Místek District in the Moravian-Silesian Region of the Czech Republic. It has about 3,500 inhabitants.

Administrative parts

The village of Myslík is an administrative part of Palkovice.

History
The first written mention of Palkovice is from 1437.

Sights
The landmark of Palkovice is the Church of Saint John the Baptist, built in 1631.

References

External links

Villages in Frýdek-Místek District